One Day It'll All Make Sense is the third studio album by rapper Common, released on September 30, 1997, on Relativity Records. It was the follow-up to his critically acclaimed album Resurrection and the last Common album to feature producer No I.D. until Common's 2011 album The Dreamer/The Believer. It was also the first album in which Common officially dropped Sense from his name.

Critical reception 

Reviewing for The Village Voice in January 1998, Robert Christgau wrote of the album:

Track listing

Charts

Singles

References

External links 
 

1997 albums
Albums produced by James Poyser
Albums produced by Karriem Riggins
Albums produced by No I.D.
Common (rapper) albums
Relativity Records albums